Tanoue (written: 田上 or 田ノ上 lit. "on the field") is a Japanese surname. Notable people with the surname include:

Donna Tanoue (born 1954), American lawyer
, Japanese baseball player
, Japanese footballer
, Japanese sport wrestler

Japanese-language surnames